Pure Pleasure is the debut album released by Jamaican singer Shaggy. The album was released on July 30, 1993. The album spawned four singles: "Oh Carolina", which was a dancehall remake of a ska hit by the Folkes Brothers, reached number one on the UK Singles Chart; "Nice and Lovely", which reached number 46 on the UK Singles Chart; "Soon Be Done", which peaked at number 39, and "Big Up", which was released as the main theme from the movie Made in America.

Reception
Elena Oumano of Los Angeles Times wrote, "This Brooklyn-based reggae rapper has two areas of interest--the bedroom and the dance floor. That’s evident from the opening track and title song, a cheerfully irreverent reworking of a classic spiritual. Producer Sting International frames Shaggy’s lighthearted rapping with fat, squishy beats and unexpected samples--like a “Carmen” aria on “Bedroom Bounty Hunter” and the “Peter Gunn” theme on “Oh Carolina”."

Track listing

Charts

References

1993 debut albums
Shaggy (musician) albums